Dániel Veszelinov (born 5 July 2001) is a Hungarian professional footballer who plays as a goalkeeper for DAC Dunajská Streda of the Fortuna Liga.

Club career

DAC Dunajská Streda
DAC signed Veszelinov as a prospective and talented player in early December 2020 from Király SZE on a two-year contract.

References

External links
 

2001 births
Living people
People from Szeged
Hungarian footballers
Hungarian expatriate footballers
Hungary under-21 international footballers
Association football goalkeepers
FC DAC 1904 Dunajská Streda players
Slovak Super Liga players
2. Liga (Slovakia) players
Expatriate footballers in Slovakia
Hungarian expatriate sportspeople in Slovakia